Draco cristatellus, the crested flying dragon, is a species of agamid lizard. It is found in Malaysia.

References

Draco (genus)
Reptiles of  Malaysia
Reptiles described in 1872
Taxa named by Albert Günther
Reptiles of Borneo